Borisoglebskoye airfield  is an experimental aviation airfield owned by Kazan Aircraft Production Association (Tupolev).  Located in the northeastern part of the city of Kazan, in the immediate vicinity of the borough Borisoglebskoe, it is designed for experimental design, experimental work, and testing aircraft products.

Since the late 1980s at the airport, Naddanom conducted test flights of Russian strategic bombers like the Tupolev Tu-160 (Blackjack), as well as passenger airliners such as the mid-range Tupolev Tu-214.

The airfield is capable of accepting all types of modern aircraft, due to the characteristics of the runway.

Video 
 Approach Tu-214. Kazan Airport "Borisoglebskoe" (factory airfield Kazan Aircraft Production Association named after Gorbunov) (YouTube.com, user DobryjTiP)

Soviet Air Force bases
Soviet Long Range Aviation
Airports built in the Soviet Union
Airports in Tatarstan
Transport in Kazan
Buildings and structures in Kazan
Tupolev